Solomino is a rural locality (a selo) in Belgorodsky District, Belgorod Oblast, Russia. The population was 6 as of 2010. There are 34 streets.

Geography 
Solomino is located 21 km east of Maysky (the district's administrative centre) by road. Tavrovo is the nearest rural locality.

References 

Rural localities in Belgorodsky District
Belgorodsky Uyezd